This list charts the most successful Pakistani films screened at cinemas in Pakistan and overseas. Pakistani films generate income from several revenue streams including box office sales (admissions), theatrical exhibitions, television broadcast rights and merchandising. See List of highest-grossing films in Pakistan for domestic gross figures.

Global gross figures
With a worldwide box-office gross of more than Rs. 274.7 crore, The Legend of Maula Jatt is the highest-grossing Pakistani film.

The following list shows Pakistan's top 24 highest-grossing films, which include films from all the Pakistani languages. These figures are not adjusted for ticket prices inflation.This is a dynamic list and may never be able to satisfy particular standards for completeness. You can help by adding missing items with reliable sources

Domestic gross figures

This is the list of top 11 highest-grossing Pakistani films within local Pakistani cinemas, which include films from all the Pakistani languages (business by foreign films in Pakistan is not included). These figures are not adjusted for ticket prices inflation.

Highest-grossing opening weekends

The following list shows Pakistan's top 11 highest-grossing opening weekends worldwide, which include films from all the Pakistani languages. For opening weekends gross in Pakistan, see List of highest-grossing opening weekends in Pakistan

These figures are not adjusted for ticket prices inflation.

Highest grossing films by year of release
This is the list of highest-grossing Pakistani films by year of release. These films are listed as per their worldwide gross figures at time of release. These figures are not adjusted for ticket prices inflation.

Timeline of highest-grossing films

Highest grossing franchises and film series

The Jawani Phir Nahi Ani franchise is Pakistan's first film franchise to gross over ₨100 crore.

See also

 List of highest-grossing films in Pakistan
 Lists of Pakistani films
 Cinema of Pakistan
 Lists of highest-grossing films
 List of 2022 box office number-one films in Pakistan

Notes

References

External links
The History of Lollywood Decade By Decade (1947—present)
Best Pakistani Movies On IMDB 
Pakistani Movies On IMDB

Highest-grossing
Pakistan
Highest-grossing